Brookula prognata is a species of minute sea snail, a marine gastropod mollusc, unassigned in the superfamily Seguenzioidea.

Distribution
This species is found only in the vicinity of the three Kings Islands, New Zealand.

References

prognata
Gastropods described in 1927
Taxa named by Harold John Finlay